Emmanuel Blairy, born 14 March 1986 in Lens (Pas-de-Calais), is a French politician, deputy in the National Assembly from January 2022 and a local civil servant of the Communauté d'agglomération de Lens – Liévin since 2006.

He was born and raised in Lens. His parents worked for the city and his uncle, Louis Blairy, was municipal councilor of Lens.

He is a member of the National Rally.

In June 2017, he became substitute to the deputy José Évrard elected in the Pas-de-Calais's 3rd constituency. He succeeded him as deputy for the third constituency on 7 January 2022, following Évrard's death. He sits in the National Assembly among the non-registered.

In the 2022 French legislative election, he won Pas-de-Calais's 1st constituency.

References

1986 births
Living people
Deputies of the 15th National Assembly of the French Fifth Republic

National Rally (France) politicians
Politicians from Hauts-de-France
People from Pas-de-Calais
People from Lens, Pas-de-Calais
Members of Parliament for Pas-de-Calais